Cluny Convent High School, Malleswaram, India, has been in existence since the year 1948. It is located in a spacious building situated on 11th Main Road, Near 15th Cross, Malleswaram, Bangalore, Karnataka State, India. It is a recognized private unaided institution run by the Bangalore branch of the Sisters of St. Joseph of Cluny, registered under Karnataka Societies Registration Act 1960.

The medium of instruction is English with Hindi and Kannada taught in the school as second and third languages. The school academic year is from June to April. Pupils are prepared for the Indian Certificate of Secondary Education (I.C.S.E) examinations taken at the end of Std. X, conducted by the Council for Indian School Certificate Examination, New Delhi.
The school consists of more than 2000 pupils in the nursery, primary (grades 1 to 4), middle school (grades 5,6,7), high school (grades 8,9 and 10) and special school (school for children with special needs).

History
Anne-Marie Javouhey is the foundress of the school. She founded the institute of Saint Joseph of Cluny at Cabilion in 1805. Her feast which is celebrated on 15 July is an annual holiday in the school.

Houses

From the 1980s to the 1990s, the four houses were:
St. Xaviers (yellow),
St. Josephs (blue),
St. Lawerence (green), and
St. Thomas (red).

The current houses are each named after four prominent saints with their respective house colours:
Theresa (Therese of Lisieux) (yellow),
Anne Marie (Anne-Marie Javouhey) (blue),
Alphonsa (Saint Alphonsa) (green), and
Cecilia (Saint Cecilia) (red).

Students from these four houses compete against each other in sports, quizzes, debates, music and dance competitions.

Facilities
The school has two playgrounds with a basketball court, throwball and volleyball courts. During the summer holidays (April and May), summer camps in basketball are held.

The school has physics, chemistry and biology laboratories and two computer labs. The school offers classes in dance, karate, singing, piano, guitar and violin. Instructors from the YSM (Young Students' Movement) also take classes for the students of grade 9.

The school has an audio-visual room, with an overhead projector and a television for the students to use for academic purposes. The students are allowed to watch educational movies and programmes here. The school houses a library with thousands of novels, Hindi and Kannada books, short story collections, and reference material. Internet facilities are also available for research.

Interested students are also trained to be Girl Guides (under the Bharat Scouts and Guides). Among the staff are three Guide Captains. The school celebrated its Golden Jubilee in Guiding with a week-long camp for Guides from all over the country, within the school. Students from the school accompanied by a Guide Captain visited London in 2007 to take part in the Centenary of Scouting.

In 2008,the Diamond Jubilee of the school was celebrated. The students presented a musical drama, "Anamica", which was seen by an audience of about 4,000 people. A Diamond Jubilee souvenir was released.

In 2012, the students presented the famous musical drama, The Sound of Music. The chief guest for this programme was Radhika Pandit, an alumna.

Staff
The Principal of the school is Sister Janet.

Notable alumni

Radhika Pandit, Kannada film actress.
Vasundhara Das, actress and singer.

References

Catholic secondary schools in India
Christian schools in Karnataka
Primary schools in Karnataka
High schools and secondary schools in Bangalore
Educational institutions established in 1948
1948 establishments in India